Aspergillus similis is a species of fungus in the genus Aspergillus. It is from the Nidulantes section. The species was first described in 2014.

Growth and morphology

A. similis has been cultivated on both Czapek yeast extract agar (CYA) plates and Malt Extract Agar Oxoid® (MEAOX) plates. The growth morphology of the colonies can be seen in the pictures below.

References 

similis
Fungi described in 2014